Ulus may refer to:

Places
Ulus, Bartın, a district in Bartin Province, Turkey
Ulus, Ankara, an important quarter in central Ankara, Turkey
Ulus (Ankara Metro), an underground station of the Ankara Metro

Other uses
Ulus (newspaper), a defunct Turkish newspaper
Orda (organization) or Ulus, a tribe, clan, village or group under a given leader
Ulus, an administrative division type of the Sakha Republic, Russia
Ulus, an inhabited locality type in the Republic of Buryatia, Russia

People with the given name
Ulus Baker (1960–2007), Turkish Cypriot sociologist

See also
Ulu (disambiguation)